Fetească Neagră) is an old pre-phylloxeric variety of Romanian - Moldovan grape, cultivated mainly in several areas in the Romanian regions of Moldavia, Muntenia, Oltenia, Banat, Northern Dobruja and also in the Republic of Moldova.

These grapes produce dry, demi-dry or sweet wines, with an alcohol content of 12-14%, a deep red colour with ruby shades, and a black currant flavour, which becomes richer and smoother with aging.

See also
 Fetească (disambiguation)

References

Red wine grape varieties
Moldovan wine
Grape varieties of Romania